The Millard's Crossing Historic Village is located at 6020 North Street, in the city and county of  Nacogdoches, in the U.S. state of Texas. It is a Recorded Texas Historic Landmark.

History
Millard's Crossing Historic Village is a  living history site established by Lera Millard Thomas in the 1970s. The Village sits on land which belonged to the Millard family, and on which Thomas grew up. The Village began in 1966 as a project restoration of a singular Victorian house by Thomas, who was the widow of Congressman Albert Thomas. From that one house, Thomas began restoring other structures  of East Texas architecture.  The Village borders on a railroad track, and is home to a restored red train caboose. There are also log cabins and other restored Victorian architecture in the Village. Of note on the property is the Millard-Lee House which Thomas restored. The house is a Recorded Texas Historic Landmark, and was built c.1837 by Robert G. Millard. The house was purchased by David Lee in 1859.

Hours, admission
Admission fee applies $10.00 for adults, $5.00 for children 3-12,  Monday – Saturday, 9:00am to 5:00pm, last tour beginning at 4:00 pm. Millard's Crossing is available for special event rentals. Tour groups and School Groups welcome. The Watkins House (1895), The Free Methodist Church (1905), The Methodist Parsonage (1900), and the Rebellion Barn are all available as venues for weddings, and other special events.

See also
List of museums in East Texas
Old Stone Fort Museum
Sterne-Hoya House Museum and Library

References

External links
 Official site

Historic house museums in Texas
Buildings and structures in Nacogdoches County, Texas
Museums in Nacogdoches County, Texas
Recorded Texas Historic Landmarks
Open-air museums in Texas
Nacogdoches, Texas